= Local Consequences of the Global Cold War =

2007 book

- Editor: Jeffrey A. Engel
- Language: English
- Genre: Non-fiction
- Publisher: Stanford University Press
- Publication date: 2007
- ISBN: 9780804759472

Local Consequences of the Global Cold War is a 2007 non-fiction book about the effects produced by the Cold War. It was published by the Stanford University Press.
